Mixomelia duplexa is a moth of the family Erebidae first described by Frederic Moore in 1882. It is found in Darjeeling, India.

References

Moths described in 1882
Herminiinae
Moths of Asia